Straight for the Heart  is a 1988 Canadian/Swiss French-language drama film. It was filmed in Montreal, It is based on Yves Navarre's novel "Kurwenal".
It was selected in the official competition of the Venice Film Festival, and the official competition at the Chicago International Film Festival.

Plot 
Pierre (Habich) is a photojournalist from Montreal who's working on a reportage in Nicaragua. There he sees many people being executed and he takes photographs of them, even of the death of a young child and of his mother crying.

Back home in Montreal, his ten-year bisexual ménage à trois is over. Sarah (Tremblay) and David (Voita) have moved out, leaving Pierre wondering why. Pierre is haunted by his experiences and memories of war, and those of his relationship with Sarah and David. The memories in his mind are mostly shown in black and white movies with emotional background music. After some time stalking David and Sarah with his photo camera, he meets the young deaf-mute Quentin (Pichette). After a while, he's able to begin a new life with Quentin.

Awards 
Straight for the Heart (1988)
 Festival International du Film Francophone de Namur, Namur, Belgium: Première Magazine First Prize, 1989
 FIN Atlantic Film Festival, Halifax, Nova Scotia: Award of Excellence, 1989

Cast
 Matthias Habich as Pierre Kurwenal
 Johanne-Marie Tremblay as Sarah
 Michel Voïta as David
 Jean-François Pichette as Quentin
 Kim Yaroshevskaya as Noemie
 Jacqueline Bertrand as Mere
 France Castel as Michele
 Pierre Gobeil as Le patron
 Victor Désy as Dr. Ferron
 Mimi D'Estée as Dame agee
 Louise Caron as Unnamed role
 Louise Marleau as Unnamed role	
 Marilyn Gardner as Unnamed role
 Albert Millaire as Unnamed role	
 Jean Gascon as Unnamed role

See also 
 List of LGBT films directed by women

References

External links 
 
 

1988 films
Canadian LGBT-related films
1988 LGBT-related films
1988 drama films
1980s French-language films
Films directed by Léa Pool
Films set in Montreal
Canadian drama films
LGBT-related drama films
Male bisexuality in film
Swiss drama films
Swiss LGBT-related films
1980s Canadian films